Isadora or Isidora is a feminine given name. It may also refer to:


Arts and entertainment
 Isadora (film), a 1968 biopic of Isadora Duncan, starring Vanessa Redgrave
 Isadora (ballet), a 1981 ballet about Isadora Duncan
 Isadora Records, a record label
 "Isadora", a song on the album Witchby the band Witch

Surname
 Rachel Isadora (born 1953), American illustrator, children's book author and painter
 Danny Isidora (born 1994), American football player

Other uses
 Isadora (software), computer software
 "Isadora", codename of Linux Mint version 9 - see Linux Mint version history
 IsaDora cosmetics, a Swedish cosmetics brand
 Isadora, Missouri, United States, an unincorporated community

See also
 Isidore (disambiguation)